A tree tent is a camping tent designed to be set above the ground, usually attached to or supported by the neighboring trees. Like a tent, it must be a complete enclosure that can house a camper and their gear while suspended off the ground.   Like tree houses, a tree tent may be accessed via a rope ladder and provide a sheltered environment for recreation and various outdoor activities. The portable nature of this type of shelter provides for more versatile location choice than a conventional tree house or a camping tent.

Some tree tents have the capacity to house 6+ people.

References

External links 
 Gear Reviews on the Nubé Hammock Shelter: 
 Tentsile Tree Tents: Elevate Your Camping Adventure
 The Ultimate Beginner's Guide to Hammock Camping: The Ultimate Beginner's Guide to Hammock Camping
 Tree Tents - The World's Greatest Glamping Escapes Tree Tents International Website
 Haven Lay-Flat Tree Tents: Life Above Ground
Tree Tent Case Study: How I Finally Got A Great Night's Sleep While Camping

Camping equipment